The Beonyeong-ro Road (Hangul : 번영로, Hanja : 繁榮路, Asian Highway Network ) is an urban expressway in Busan, Korea. It is the 1st urban expressway in South Korea.

It begins at 4th Pier in Dong-gu, Busan and it ends at Guseo IC in Geumjeong-gu, Busan. It was toll road but now you can run this road no charge from January 2004.

It touches with Gyeongbu Expressway and National Route 7. So you can approach downtown in Busan rapidly.

It is on the Asian Highway Network . To south, you can go to Japan by ferry and to north, you can go to Gyeongbu Expressway.

Friend was filmed at Chungjang Elevated Road on this road: in Dong-gu, Busan.

Interchange and Junction 

 4th Pier IC
 Dongcheon Junction
 Munhyeon IC
 Daeyeon IC
 Mangmi IC
 Wondong IC
 Geumsa IC
 Seokdae Elevated Road IC
 Hoedong JC (Gateway of Jeonggwan Indus Zn.)
 Guseo IC (Gyeongbu Expressway, National Route 7 and Asian Highway Network )

Tunnels 
On Beonyeong-no Road, there are 5 tunnels.
 Munhyeon Tunnel
 Daeyeong Tunnel
 Gwangan Tunnel
 Suyeong Tunnel
 Oryun Tunnel

Information 
 You can't run this road by Motorcycle (An Emergency vehicle is excluded. A thing as an emergency vehicle says a Police motorcycle), Moped, Agricultural machinery (Rotary tiller, Tractor), Bicycle, and on foot because this road is a motorway.

Transport 
Bus routes which use the crossing:
 Busan Urban Bus 1007: from Wondong IC to Hoedong JC.
 Intercity bus : Haeundae ~ Busan (Nopo-dong) ~ Osan·Suwon·Ansan·Bucheon - from Wondong IC to Guseo IC (by Gyeongnam Express: 경남고속).

See also 
 AH1
 AH6
 Gyeongbu Expressway

References

AH1
Former toll roads
Roads in Busan